Jozef Kalina (November 22, 1924 in Bratislava – April 21, 1986 in Bratislava) was a Czechoslovak/Slovak basketball player who competed in the 1948 Summer Olympics.

He was part of the Czechoslovak basketball team, which finished seventh in the 1948 Olympic tournament.

References

1924 births
1986 deaths
Sportspeople from Bratislava
Czechoslovak men's basketball players
Slovak men's basketball players
Olympic basketball players of Czechoslovakia
Basketball players at the 1948 Summer Olympics